Tinguiririca Volcano is a massive and active stratovolcano located in Chile's VI Region (O'Higgins) and near the Argentinian border. Constant fumarolic activity occurs within and on the NW wall of its summit crater and hot springs and fumaroles can also be seen on the western flanks, as illustrated by the image on the right.
It was near this volcano that the Uruguayan Air Force Flight 571 crashed in 1972 with its survivors lost for seventy-two days.

See also 
 List of volcanoes in Chile
 Tinguiririca River

References 
 

Mountains of Chile
Stratovolcanoes of Chile
Active volcanoes
Volcanoes of O'Higgins Region